René Lacoste defeated the defending champion Henri Cochet 6–1, 4–6, 6–4, 6–2 in the final to win the gentlemen's singles tennis title at the 1928 Wimbledon Championships.

Seeds

  Henri Cochet (final)
  René Lacoste (champion)
  Bill Tilden (semifinals)
  Frank Hunter (first round)
  Jean Borotra (quarterfinals)
  John Hennessey (quarterfinals)
  Uberto de Morpurgo (quarterfinals)
  Gerald Patterson (fourth round)

Draw

Finals

Top half

Section 1

Section 2

Section 3

Section 4

Bottom half

Section 5

Section 6

Section 7

Section 8

References

External links

Men's Singles
Wimbledon Championship by year – Men's singles